Ringfad is a townland of 181 acres in County Down, Northern Ireland. It is situated in the civil parish of Ardglass and the historic barony of Lecale Lower.

The name refers to the broad peninsula adjoining Ardglass on the south and forming the eastern side of Coney Island Bay. The point of land at the end of the peninsula is known as Ringfad Point.

See also
List of townlands in County Down

References

Townlands of County Down
Civil parish of Ardglass